Samuel Beck may refer to:
 Samuel Jacob Beck (1896–1980), American psychologist 
 Samuel J. Beck (1835–1906), metallurgist, land developer and politician in Montana and Los Angeles